Olaf Kopvillem (1 November 1926 – 23 July 1997) was a prominent Estonian World War II refugee.  Having settled in Canada, he engaged in the organisation of Estonian exile activities there, and is known for his numerous humorous covers of well-known songs.

Kopvillem was born in Kiviõli, Estonia.  As a high school student, he joined Eesti Omakaitse and was recruited in the German army, come World War II.  In 1944, he emigrated to Germany and later to Canada, where he graduated from Sir George Williams University majoring in chemistry.

Kopvillem headed Montreal Estonian female choir, and was for almost 20 years the leader of Montreal Estonian mixed choir.  He also taught at Vikerlased, a folk music group.

He died in Burlington, Ontario, Canada or 23 July 1997 in Toronto, Ontario, Canada, of Parkinson's disease.

Awards
In 1996, Olaf Kopvillem was awarded the Meie Mats.

Reuse
A number of Kopvillem's melodies and lyrics have been covered in couplet songs by Talong.

Discography
 Vindilised viisid
 Pastoraal
 Puhkus
 Eluloolised märkmed
 Nii me elame
 Tsivillisatsioon
 Immigrant Austriast
 Jõulud
 Võta käru ja käruta
 Sauna taga, tiigi ääres
 Viise ja vinte
 Videvik
 Arm küll polnud see
 Romanss
 Sügisüksildus
 September
 Cachita
 Sularaha eest
 Rio Grand
 Koduigatsus
 Klunker
 Lenda, lenda, lepalind
 Lenda, lenda, lepalind
 Rannal
 Rohutirts
 Kevadtuul ja sina
 Ball
 Sügis
 Igatsus
 Sigarett
 Üks naljakas laul

References

1926 births
1997 deaths
Estonian World War II refugees
Estonian emigrants to Canada
Recipients of Meie Mats
People from Kiviõli
Estonian humorists
Estonian choral conductors
20th-century conductors (music)
20th-century Estonian male singers
20th-century Estonian composers